The Bomb Factory Art Foundation is an artist-led foundation with exhibition space for contemporary art, based in Archway, Islington, London, England.

The Bomb Factory organises exhibitions and events, including open studio events.

Exhibited artists include Rachel Ara, Alfie Kunga, Paul Stafford, Mark Wallinger (2007 Turner Prize winner),, Jwan Yosef (founder member). and Polly Morgan.

References

External links
 The Bomb Factory Art Foundation website
 
 

2015 establishments in England
Arts organizations established in 2015
Art galleries established in 2015
Arts organisations based in England
Non-profit organisations based in London
English artist groups and collectives
Organisations based in the London Borough of Islington
Contemporary art galleries in London